Trochomorpha is a genus of air-breathing land snails, terrestrial pulmonate gastropod mollusks in the family Trochomorphidae.

Species 
Species within the genus Trochomorpha include:
 
 Trochomorpha abrochroa (Crosse, 1868)
 Trochomorpha accurata Mousson, 1870
 Trochomorpha albostriata Mousson, 1870
 Trochomorpha apia (Hombron & Jacquinot, 1852)
 Trochomorpha apicis B. Rensch, 1931
 Trochomorpha approximata (Le Guillou, 1842)
 Trochomorpha assimilis Garrett, 1884
 Trochomorpha aukiensis Clapp, 1923
 Trochomorpha backhuysi Delsaerdt, 2016
 Trochomorpha beckiana (L. Pfeiffer, 1842)
 Trochomorpha belmorei (Cox, 1872)
 Trochomorpha benigna (L. Pfeiffer, 1863)
 Trochomorpha borealis Möllendorff, 1888
 Trochomorpha burrowsi H. B. Baker, 1941
 Trochomorpha carolinae H. B. Baker, 1941
 Trochomorpha ceroconus (L. Pfeiffer, 1864)
 Trochomorpha concava Clapp, 1923
 Trochomorpha concolor O. Boettger, 1890
 Trochomorpha conoides H. B. Baker, 1941
 Trochomorpha contigua  Pease, 1871
 Trochomorpha corallina Mousson, 1870
 Trochomorpha cornea Hedley, 1891
 Trochomorpha corneofusca I. Rensch & B. Rensch, 1929: synonym of Trochomorpha mejmi corneofusca I. Rensch & B. Rensch, 1929
 Trochomorpha cressida (A. Gould, 1846)
 Trochomorpha crustulum (Cox, 1873)
 Trochomorpha dautzenbergi Sykes, 1904
 Trochomorpha deiopeia (Angas, 1869)
 Trochomorpha depressostriata Mousson, 1870
 Trochomorpha discrepans van Benthem Jutting, 1964
 Trochomorpha dondani Thach & F. Huber, 2021
 Trochomorpha eurydice (A. Gould, 1846)
 Trochomorpha exaltata (L. Pfeiffer, 1855)
 Trochomorpha exclusa (Quoy & Gaimard, 1825)
 Trochomorpha fatigata (Cox, 1873)
 Trochomorpha fessonia (Angas, 1869)
 Trochomorpha flava Clapp, 1923
 Trochomorpha froggatti (Iredale, 1941)
 Trochomorpha godeti G. B. Sowerby III, 1890
 Trochomorpha gulielmi Sykes, 1904
 Trochomorpha haptoderma Vermeulen, Liew & Schilthuizen, 2015
 Trochomorpha henschei (L. Pfeiffer, 1867)
 Trochomorpha hidalgoiana (Crosse, 1864)
 Trochomorpha huberi Thach, 2018
 Trochomorpha jampeana E. A. Smith, 1896
 Trochomorpha johnabbasi Thach, 2021
 Trochomorpha juanita (Angas, 1873)
 Trochomorpha kambarae H. B. Baker, 1941
 Trochomorpha kantavuensis Garrett, 1887
 Trochomorpha kierulfi (Mörch, 1850)
 Trochomorpha kuesteri (L. Pfeiffer, 1845)
 Trochomorpha latimarginata (E. A. Smith, 1884)
 Trochomorpha lofti Delsaerdt, 2016
 Trochomorpha ludersi (L. Pfeiffer, 1855)
 Trochomorpha luteocornea (Reeve, 1854)
 Trochomorpha manni Clapp, 1923
 Trochomorpha matura (L. Pfeiffer, 1855)
 Trochomorpha mcleani Clench, 1958
 Trochomorpha mejmi (Leschke, 1912)
 Trochomorpha meleagris (L. Pfeiffer, 1855)
 Trochomorpha melvillensis Solem, 1988
 Trochomorpha membranicosta (L. Pfeiffer, 1854)
 Trochomorpha merziana (L. Pfeiffer, 1853)
 Trochomorpha merzianoides (Garrett, 1873)
 Trochomorpha moalensis H. B. Baker, 1941
 Trochomorpha morio Tapparone Canefri, 1886
 Trochomorpha neuhausi I. Rensch, 1930
 Trochomorpha nigrans E. A. Smith, 1889
 Trochomorpha nigritella  (L. Pfeiffer, 1847)
 Trochomorpha ottonis I. Rensch, 1930
 Trochomorpha pallens Pease, 1871
 Trochomorpha papua (Lesson, 1831)
 Trochomorpha partunda Angas, 1868
 Trochomorpha patrium I. Rensch & B. Rensch, 1929
 Trochomorpha patulaeformis I. Rensch & B. Rensch, 1929
 Trochomorpha paviei (Morlet, 1885)
 Trochomorpha percompressa (W. T. Blanford, 1869)
 Trochomorpha planoconus Garrett, 1887
 Trochomorpha rhoda (Angas, 1876)
 Trochomorpha rhysa Tillier & Bouchet, 1989
 Trochomorpha robusta P. Sarasin & F. Sarasin, 1899
 Trochomorpha rubens W. D. Hartman, 1888
 Trochomorpha saigonensis (Crosse, 1867)
 Trochomorpha samoa (Hombron & Jacquinot, 1841)
 Trochomorpha sanctaeannae (E. A. Smith, 1885)
 Trochomorpha sapeca (Heude, 1890)
 Trochomorpha scytodes (L. Pfeiffer, 1854)
 Trochomorpha serena (Cox, 1873)
 Trochomorpha solarium (Quoy & Gaimard, 1832)
 Trochomorpha strubelli O. Boettger, 1890
 Trochomorpha swainsoni (L. Pfeiffer, 1846)
 Trochomorpha synoecia Möllendorff, 1891
 Trochomorpha tavinniensis (Garrett, 1872)
 Trochomorpha tentoriolum (Gould, 1846)
 Trochomorpha ternatana (Le Guillou, 1842)
 Trochomorpha tertia I. Rensch & B. Rensch, 1929: synonym of Trochomorpha mejmi tertia I. Rensch & B. Rensch, 1929 (original rank)
 Trochomorpha thachi F. Huber, 2020
 Trochomorpha thelecoryphe Vermeulen, Liew & Schilthuizen, 2015
 Trochomorpha trachus Vermeulen, Liew & Schilthuizen, 2015
 Trochomorpha transarata (Mousson, 1865)
 Trochomorpha troilus (Gould, 1846)
 Trochomorpha tuber Mousson, 1869
 Trochomorpha tumulus (A. Gould, 1846)
 Trochomorpha tuvuthae H. B. Baker, 1941
 Trochomorpha typus H. B. Baker, 1941
 Trochomorpha unica I. Rensch & B. Rensch, 1935
 Trochomorpha vanderrieti Clench, 1965
 Trochomorpha vestersi I. Rensch & B. Rensch, 1929
 Trochomorpha vicdani Thach & F. Huber, 2021
 Trochomorpha vincekessneri Thach, 2021
 Trochomorpha xiphias (L. Pfeiffer, 1856)
 Trochomorpha zenobia (L. Pfeiffer, 1864)
 Trochomorpha zenobiella Clapp, 1923

References 

 Bank, R. A. (2017). Classification of the Recent terrestrial Gastropoda of the World. Last update: July 16th, 2017

External links
 Albers, J. C. (1850). Die Heliceen nach natürlicher Verwandtschaft systematisch geordnet. Berlin: Enslin. 262 pp
 Iredale, T. (1941). A basic list of the land Mollusca of Papua. The Australian Zoologist. 10(1): 51-94, pls. 3-4
 Baker, H. B. (1941). Zonitid snails from Pacific islands. Part 3 and 4. Bernice P. Bishop Museum Bulletin. 166: 203–370
 Solem, A. (1959). Systematics and zoogeography of the land and fresh-water Mollusca of the New Hebrides. Fieldiana Zoology. 4(3): 1-359
  Semper, C. (1870-1885). Reisen im Archipel der Philippinen, Theil 2. Wissenschaftliche Resultate. Band 3, Landmollusken. Wiesbaden: Kreidel
 Animal Base info on the genus

Trochomorphidae